The Wiederkehr Wine Cellar is a historic wine cellar in Franklin County, Arkansas.  It is located north of Altus, on the grounds of the Wiederkehr Winery.  It presently houses the winery's restaurant.  The cellar was dug by hand, by the winery's founder, John Wiederkehr, with a native stone floor and heavy wooden posts supporting its ceiling.  An addition c. 1900 gave the cellar an L shape.  The cellar is topped by a log house, also built by Wiederkehr when he built the cellar.  The winery is one of the oldest in Arkansas.

The cellar was listed on the National Register of Historic Places in 1977.

See also
National Register of Historic Places listings in Franklin County, Arkansas

References

External links
Wiederkehr Weinkellar Restaurant web site

Agricultural buildings and structures on the National Register of Historic Places in Arkansas
Buildings and structures in Franklin County, Arkansas
National Register of Historic Places in Franklin County, Arkansas